Greater Need is the fifth studio album by American country music artist Lorrie Morgan, released in 1996. It included three singles, all of which entered the Billboard country singles charts: "By My Side" (a duet with then-husband Jon Randall), "I Just Might Be" and "Good as I Was to You."

Allmusic rated the album three stars out of five, with its review by Thom Owens saying that some tracks were "filler" but that "Morgan's performance is consistently stunning."

Track listing

Personnel
As listed in liner notes.
Eddie Bayers – drums
Michael Black – background vocals
Larry Byrom – acoustic guitar
Glen Duncan – fiddle, mandolin
Paul Franklin – steel guitar, Dobro
Sonny Garrish – steel guitar, Dobro
John Hobbs – piano
Dann Huff – electric guitar
David Hungate – bass guitar
Jana King – background vocals
Alison Krauss – background vocals
Paul Leim – drums
Terry McMillan – harmonica, percussion
Matt Rollings – piano
Joe Spivey – fiddle, mandolin
Billy Joe Walker, Jr. – acoustic guitar
Cindy Walker – background vocals
Glenn Worf – bass guitar
Curtis Young – background vocals

Chart performance

Albums

Singles

References

1996 albums
BNA Records albums
Lorrie Morgan albums
Albums produced by James Stroud